Egri Vízilabda Klub is a Hungarian water polo club based in Eger. One of the dominant teams in the country since the late 2000s, Eger won the national championship in 2011,2013,2014 and came in second in 2012. They also collected the gold medal in the Hungarian cup in 1972 and 2007. Beside the domestic successes they also finished runners-up in the LEN Cup in 2008.

Starting from summer 2010 the club is known as ZF Eger after its main sponsor ZF Friedrichshafen.

Naming history
 Egri TE: (1910 – 1943)
 MOVE Egri SE: (1920 – 1945)
 Egri Barátság SE: (1945 – 1947)
 Egri SZTK: (1948 – 1949)
 Egri ÁVESZ: (1950)
 Egri Fáklya SK: (1951 – 1954)
 Egri Bástya SE: (1955 – 1956)
 Eger SE: (1957)
 Egri SC: (1958 – 1959)
 Egri Vasas SK: (1960)
 Egri Dózsa SC: (1961 – 1976)
 Eger SE: (1977 – 1992/93)
 ÚVK-Eger: (1993/94)
 ÚVMK Eger: (1993/94 – 1995/96)
 ÚVMK Eger-Egervin: (1996/97 – 1998/99)
 ÚVMK BauSystem-Eger: (1999/00)
 UPC-Egri VK: (2000/01)
 Egri VK: (2001/02 – 2002/03) 
 ZF Hungária Egri VK: (2002/03 – 2003/04)
 Brendon-ZF-Eger: (2004/05)
 Brendon-Fenstherm-ZF-Eger: (2005/06 – 2007/08)
 Brendon-UPC-ZF-Egri VK: (2007/08)
 ZF-Eger: (2008/09 – 2019/20)
 Tigra-ZF-Eger: (2020/21 – ... )

Honours

Domestic competitions 
Országos Bajnokság I (National Championship of Hungary)
 Champions (3): 2010–11, 2012–13, 2013–14

Magyar Kupa (National Cup of Hungary)
 Winners (4): 1972, 2007, 2008, 2015

European competitions 
LEN Champions League
Fourth place (1): 2016–17

LEN Euro Cup
Runners-up (1): 2007–08

Current squad
Season 2020–21

Staff

Transfers (2017-18)
Source: vizipolo.hu

 In:
  Marko Avramović (from Ferencváros)
 Strahinja Rašović (from Barceloneta)
 Angelos Vlachopoulos (from Posillipo)

 Out:
 Miloš Ćuk (from Szolnoki Dózsa)
 Balázs Erdélyi (to Orvosegyetem)
 Boris Vapenski (to Ortigia)

Recent seasons

 Cancelled due to the COVID-19 pandemic.

In European competition
Participations in Champions League (Champions Cup, Euroleague): 13x
Participations in Euro Cup (LEN Cup): 3x

Notable former players

Olympic champions
Dénes Pócsik – 24 years (1954-1978)  1964 Tokyo
András Bodnár – 9 years (1952-1961)  1964 Tokyo 
Péter Biros – 9 years (2007-2016)  2000 Sydney, 2004 Athens, 2008 Beijing
Zoltán Szécsi - 7 years (2004-2005, 2007-2013)  2000 Sydney, 2004 Athens, 2008 Beijing 
István Hevesi – 6 years (1945-1951)  1956 Melbourne
Norbert Hosnyánszky – 6 years (2010-2012, 2014- )  2008 Beijing
Gábor Kis – 5 years (2004-2008, 2010-2011)  2008 Beijing
 Branislav Mitrović – 4 years (2014-)  2016 Rio de Janeiro
 Miloš Ćuk – 3 years (2014-2017)  2016 Rio de Janeiro
Miklós Ambrus – 2 years (1950-1952)  1964 Tokyo
Tamás Märcz – 1 year (2006-2007)  2000 Sydney
Norbert Madaras – junior years  2004 Athens, 2008 Beijing

Former coaches

 György Gerendás (2004–2014)
 Norbert Dabrowski (2014– present)

References

External links
 

Eger
Sports clubs established in 1910
Water polo clubs in Hungary